Markam County, is a county under the jurisdiction of the Chamdo in the Tibet Autonomous Region, bordering the provinces of Sichuan to the east and Yunnan to the south. It is the easternmost county-level division of the Tibet A.R.

Climate

Transportation 
 China National Highway 214
 China National Highway 318

References

Counties of Tibet
Chamdo